Naha Airport  is an airport serving the locality of Tahuna, in the Sangihe Islands, part of the North Sulawesi province of Indonesia. The airport is previously connected to Manado by daily Wings Air flights.

Airlines and destinations

References

Airports in North Sulawesi